Tom Jennings (born 1955) is an American artist and technician, creator of FidoNet.

Tom or Thomas Jennings may also refer to:

Tom Jennings (pool player) (born 1951), American pool player and mathematics professor
Tom Jennings (footballer) (1902–1973), Scottish footballer
Tom Jennings (cricketer) (1896–1972), English cricketer
Thomas Albert Jennings (1865–1917), Florida politician
Thomas L. Jennings (1791–1856), African-American tradesman and abolitionist
Thomas Walter Jennings (1917–1978), founder of Jennings Organ Company

See also
Thomas Jennings Bailey (1867–1963), American judge